Wacker may refer to:

People 
Wacker von Wackenfels
The Whacker, poker player Garry Bush's nickname
Wacker (surname)
 Wacker, a colloquial term for an inhabitant of Liverpool, England; a partial synonym for "scouser"

Places
Wacker (Heve), a river of North Rhine-Westphalia, Germany
Wacker, Illinois, an unincorporated community in Carroll County, Illinois, United States
Wacker Township, McPherson County, South Dakota, United States
Ward Cove, Alaska, United States, also called Wacker, an unincorporated community in Ketchikan Gateway Borough
Wacker Drive, a street in Chicago, Illinois, United States

Companies
Wacker Chemie, Munich, Germany
Wacker Neuson, Munich, Germany

Sports

Austria
FC Admira Wacker Mödling, a football club from Mödling
FC Wacker Innsbruck, a defunct association football club from Innsbruck
FC Wacker Innsbruck (2002), an existing association football club from Innsbruck

Germany
Wacker 04 Berlin, a former football club based in Berlin
Wacker Bernburg, a former association football club from Bernburg, Saxony
FC Wacker Biberach, a former association football club from Biberach an der Riß, Baden-Württemberg, that has merged with another club to FV Biberach
SV Wacker Burghausen, a football club based in Burghausen, Bavaria
Wacker-Arena, their stadium
SV Wacker Burghausen II a defunct football club, reserve team of SV Wacker Burghausen
Wacker Leipzig, a defunct association football club playing in Leipzig
FC Wacker München, an association football club based in the Sendling borough of Munich
FSV Wacker 90 Nordhausen, an association football club from Nordhausen, Thuringia
FSV Wacker 03 Gotha, an association football club from Gotha, Thuringia

Switzerland
Wacker Thun, a team handball club from Thun

Other uses 
Wacker process, a chemical reaction
Vibrating plate compactor, a construction tool
The Wackers, an American rock band based in Montreal, Canada.
The Wackers (TV series), 1975 British sitcom created by Vince Powell

See also
 Wack (disambiguation)